Sándor Szabó (29 January 1941 – 7 August 1992) was a Hungarian fencer. He competed in the individual and team foil events at the 1964, 1968 and 1972 Summer Olympics.

References

External links
 

1941 births
1992 deaths
Hungarian male foil fencers
Olympic fencers of Hungary
Fencers at the 1964 Summer Olympics
Fencers at the 1968 Summer Olympics
Fencers at the 1972 Summer Olympics
Fencers from Budapest